Colchicum bulbocodium, the spring meadow saffron, is a species of alpine bulbous plant native to mountain ranges across Europe from the Pyrenees to the Caucasus (Spain, France, Italy, Switzerland, Austria, Hungary, Romania, the former Yugoslavia, Ukraine and southern European Russia). 

It is cultivated as an ornamental plant in many places. It has flowers considered ideal for the rock garden, which is beautiful en masse. The plant is a hardy spring flower bulb, very small in size, reaching about 7–10 cm high. From April to June, the strap-shaped leaves emerge with pink-to-purple crocus-like flowers, 3–8 cm in diameter. As all the species of the genus Colchicum, the species is a poisonous plant.

Subspecies and varieties
Three infraspecific taxa of the species are currently recognized:
 Colchicum bulbocodium subsp. bulbocodium
 var. bulbocodium
 var. edentatum (Schur) K.Perss (syn. Bulbocodium edentatum Schur.) is indigenous to Romania.
 Colchicum bulbocodium subsp. versicolor  (Ker Gawl.) K. Perss. (syn. Bulbocodium versicolor (Ker Gawl.) Spreng.) is native in Eastern Europe and the Caucasus. The plant is in all its parts smaller than Colchicum bulbocodium subsp. bulbocodium.

References

External links

Bulbocodium vernum
Botanica Sistematica

bulbocodium
Alpine flora
Flora of the Alps
Flora of the Pyrenees
Flora of Spain
Flora of France
Flora of Italy
Flora of Switzerland
Flora of Austria
Flora of Hungary
Flora of Romania
Flora of Ukraine
Flora of Russia
Flora of Slovenia
Flora of Croatia
Flora of Bosnia and Herzegovina
Garden plants of Europe